{| class="infobox" style="width: 22em; text-align: left; font-size: 85%; vertical-align: middle;"
|+  Salma Hayek awards and nominations
|- style="background:#d9e8ff; text-align:center;"
!style="vertical-align: middle;"| Award
| style="background:#cec; font-size:8pt; width:60px;"| Wins| style="background:#ecc; font-size:8pt; width:60px;"| Nominations
|- style="background:#eef;"
| style="text-align:center;"|
Academy Awards
| 
| 
|- style="background:#eef;"
| style="text-align:center;"|
British Academy Film Awards
| 
| 
|- style="background:#eef;"
| style="text-align:center;"|
Golden Globe Awards
| 
| 
|- style="background:#eef;" 
| style="text-align:center;"|
Emmy Awards
| 
| 
|- style="background:#eef;"
| style="text-align:center;"|
Producers Guild of America Awards
| 
| 
|- style="background:#eef;"
| style="text-align:center;"|
ALMA Awards
| 
| 
|}

Salma Hayek is a Mexican and American actress who made her acting debut in the Mexican television series in Un Nuevo Amanecer (1988–1989), before becoming a household name to Hispanic audiences for her starring role in Teresa, a successful telenovela that aired on Televisa for two years and 125 episodes. After moving to the United States, Hayek initially struggled as an actress. In 1995, however, she found early acclaim for her performance in the drama Midaq Alley (El Callejon de los Milagros) and obtained her Hollywood breakthrough in the action-orientated Desperado, directed by Robert Rodriguez, who would become a frequent collaborator. She soon established herself in Hollywood with roles that relied significantly on her sex appeal in films such as From Dusk till Dawn (1996), Wild Wild West (1999) and Dogma (1999).

Hayek founded her production company, Ventanarosa, in 1999, through which she produces film and television projects. The biographical film Frida (2002) —in which she served as a producer and portrayed painter Frida Kahlo— made her the first Mexican actress to be nominated for the Academy Award for Best Actress and, in addition, earned her Golden Globe Award, Screen Actors Guild Award and British Academy Film Award nominations. She has since starred in a diverse list of films, including Once Upon a Time in Mexico (2003), After the Sunset (2004), Bandidas (2006),  Grown Ups (2010), Grown Ups 2 (2013), Tale of Tales (2015), Beatriz at Dinner (2017), The Hitman's Bodyguard (2017), Eternals (2021) and House of Gucci (2021). She has also lent her voice for the animated Puss in Boots (2011), The Pirates! In an Adventure with Scientists! (2012), Kahlil Gibran's The Prophet (2014), Sausage Party (2016) and Puss in Boots: The Last Wish (2022).

Hayek has received seven ALMA Awards nominations and was the recipient of the 2009 Anthony Quinn Award for Achievement in Motion Pictures by the association. Her directing, producing and acting work on television has garnered Hayek four Emmy Award nominations. She won the Daytime Emmy Award for Outstanding Directing in a Children Special for The Maldonado Miracle (2004) and received two Primetime Emmy Award nominations, one for Outstanding Guest Actress in a Comedy Series and the other for Outstanding Comedy Series, for her work on the ABC series Ugly Betty (2006–10). She has also been the recipient of  Glamour magazine Woman of the Year Award in 2001, the Producers Guild of America Celebration of Diversity Award in 2003, the Harvard Foundation Artist of the Year Award in 2006, and the Franca Sozzani Award at the Venice Film Festival in 2018. In 2011, Hayek was appointed Knight (Chevalier) of the National Order of the Legion of Honour,  the highest French order of merit, and in 2021, she was honored with a star on the Hollywood Walk of Fame.

Screen credits

Film

Television

Music videos

Awards and nominations

Footnotes

References

Actress filmographies
Lists of awards received by American actor
Mexican filmographies
American filmographies